Antoine Volodine (born 1950) is the pseudonym of a Russian-French writer. He initially was interested in the original Association des Écrivains et Artistes Révolutionnaires. His works often involve cataclysms and have scenes of interrogations. He won the Grand Prix de l'Imaginaire in 1987. Des anges mineurs (trans. Minor Angels), one of his best-known works, won the Prix du Livre Inter and Prix Wepler in 2000. He won the Prix Médicis in 2014 for his latest novel, Terminus radieux.

Volodine writes under multiple heteronyms, including Lutz Bassmann, Manuela Draeger, and Elli Kronauer. He has also translated literary works from Russian into French, including such authors as Eduard Limonov, Arkady and Boris Strugatsky, Viktoriya Tokareva, Alexander Ikonnikov, and Maria Sudayeva (who may be another pseudonym of Volodine's).

Bibliography

In English

As Antoine Volodine
 Solo Viola (translated by Lia Swope Mitchell)
 Naming the Jungle (translated by Linda Coverdale)
 Minor Angels (translated by Jordan Stump)
 Post-Exoticism in Ten Lessons, Lesson Eleven (translated by J.T. Mahany)
 Bardo or not Bardo (translated by J.T. Mahany)
 Writers (translated by Katina Rogers)
 Radiant Terminus (translated by Jeffrey Zuckerman)
 The Monroe Girls (translated by Alyson Waters)

As Lutz Bassmann
 We Monks & Soldiers (translated by Jordan Stump)
 Black Village (translated by Jeffrey Zuckerman, forthcoming December 2021)

As Manuela Draeger
 In the Time of the Blue Ball (translated by Brian Evenson with Valerie Evenson)
 Contains "In the Time of the Blue Ball," "North of the Wolverines," and "Our Baby Pelicans"
 "Belle-Medusa" (translated by Valerie Evenson and Brian Evenson) in xo Orpheus: Fifty New Myths, ed. Kate Bernheimer
 "The Arrest of the Great Mimille" (translated by Valerie Mariana and Brian Evenson) in The Big Book of Modern Fantasy, ed. Ann VanderMeer and Jeff VanderMeer
 Eleven Sooty Dreams (translated by J.T. Mahany)

References

20th-century French non-fiction writers
21st-century French non-fiction writers
French science fiction writers
Russian science fiction writers
People from Chalon-sur-Saône
1950 births
Living people
French male novelists
Russian male novelists
Prix du Livre Inter winners
Prix Médicis winners
French–Russian translators
20th-century French male writers